Hesam (Persian: حسام) may refer to:

Geography
Mir Hesam village in Posht-e Arbaba Rural District, Alut District, Baneh County, Kurdistan Province
Mirza Hesam village in Hajjilar-e Shomali Rural District, Hajjilar

People
Hesam Bakhsheshi (1984) Iranian male volleyball player
Hessam Abrishami Iranian-American artist

Hesam Asghari,Iranian-American actor and husband of Britney Spears